This is a list of any populated place in Uruguay by department, sortable by population (according to the 2011 census) or alphabetically. The population number may be followed by a letter indicating the official status of the place as follows:

Artigas Department 
Populated places in the Artigas Department (census 2011):

Canelones Department
Populated places in the Canelones Department (census 2011):

 * Parts of Ciudad de la Costa and the municipality of the same name.
 ** Localities connected to Ciudad de la Costa, according to the INE, but which do not belong to its municipality. Their population has not been summed to that of the city in Wikipedia.

Cerro Largo Department
Populated places in the Cerro Largo Department (census 2011):

Colonia Department
Populated places in Colonia Department (census 2011):

Durazno Department
Populated places in the Durazno Department (census 2011):

Flores Department
Populated places in the Flores Department (census 2011):

Florida Department
Populated places in the Florida Department (census 2011):

Lavalleja Department
Populated places in the Lavalleja Department (census 2011):

Maldonado Department
Populated places in the Maldonado Department (census 2011):

Montevideo Department
Populated places in the Montevideo Department (census 2011):

Paysandú Department
Populated places in the Paysandú Department (census 2011):

Rivera Department
Populated places in the Rivera Department (census 2011):

Río Negro Department
Populated places in the Río Negro Department (census 2011):

Rocha Department
Populated places in the Rocha Department (census 2011):

Salto Department
Populated places in the Salto Department (census 2011):

San José Department
Populated places in the San José Department (census 2011):

* Places that have been integrated into Ciudad del Plata in 2006.

Soriano Department
Populated places in the Soriano Department (census 2011):

Tacuarembó Department
Populated places in the Tacuarembó Department (census 2011):

Treinta y Tres Department
Populated places in the Treinta y Tres Department (census 2011):

References

External links

 
Uruguay geography-related lists
Uruguay